Acrepidopterum capilosum is a species of beetle in the family Cerambycidae. It was described by Martins and Galileo in 2008.

References

Apomecynini
Beetles described in 2008